"Waterfall" is a song by Norwegian production duo Stargate, featuring vocals by American singer Pink and Australian singer Sia. The song was released on 10 March 2017 on RCA Records.

Writing and recording
The song was written by Stargate, alongside Diplo, Sia and Jr. Blender. It was reportedly Sia's idea to recruit P!nk for the song. 

The song was originally conducted by Sia, in partnership with Diplo and Jr Blender, and was intended to give the song to Cashmere Cat for his debut album 9, with Sia credited as a featured artist. However, the track was rejected as the original tracklist for the album was leaked and Cashmere Cat scrapped most of the project, delaying the release date of the album. Sia, however, was determined to search for a worthy artist for the song and gave it to Stargate instead, recruiting P!nk along the way.

Critical reception
Stereogums Peter Helman opined that the song "sounds very 2017."

Music video
The music video was released on 16 March 2017 featuring sky dancing by Inka Henriikka Tiitto and Amalie Hegland Lauritzen. Idolator noted that neither P!nk nor Sia appears in the video, which they called a "letdown."

Charts

Weekly charts

Year-end charts

Certifications

Release history

References

2017 singles
2017 songs
Dance-pop songs
Pink (singer) songs
RCA Records singles
Sia (musician) songs
Song recordings produced by Diplo
Song recordings produced by Stargate (record producers)
Songs written by Diplo
Songs written by Mikkel Storleer Eriksen
Songs written by Sia (musician)
Songs written by Tor Erik Hermansen
Stargate (record producers) songs
Songs written by Jr Blender